"Big Love" is a song written by Jeff Stevens and Michael Clark, and recorded by American country music artist Tracy Byrd. It was released in September 1996 as the lead-off single and title track from his album of the same name.  It peaked at number 3 in the United States, and number 5 in Canada. The song was previously recorded in 1994 by Chris LeDoux from his album Haywire, and released as the b-side to his single "Dallas Days and Fort Worth Nights."

Critical reception
Larry Flick, of Billboard magazine reviewed the song favorable by saying that "the groove-oriented introduction of this song kicks off its big-sounding production, and Byrd's voice delivers the lyric with buoyant enthusiasm. He also stated that the song shows that Byrd is delivering radio-ready material that will fare well on the radio.

Music video
The music video was directed by Gerry Wenner and was filmed in Denver, Colorado, Winter Park, Colorado and just east of Winter Park on west Rollins Pass.

Chart positions

Year-end charts

References

1996 singles
1996 songs
Tracy Byrd songs
Chris LeDoux songs
Song recordings produced by Tony Brown (record producer)
Songs written by Michael Clark (songwriter)
Songs written by Jeff Stevens (singer)
MCA Nashville Records singles